Philip  Gordon "Skip" Krake (born October 14, 1943) is a Canadian former ice hockey centre. He played in the National Hockey League with the Boston Bruins, Los Angeles Kings, and Buffalo Sabres between 1964 and 1971. In addition, he played in the World Hockey Association with the Cleveland Crusaders and Edmonton Oilers between 1972 and 1976.

In his NHL career, Krake appeared in 249 games, scoring 23 goals and adding 40 assists. He played in 207 WHA games, scoring 52 goals and adding 77 assists.

Krake's first NHL goal came on February 14, 1967 in Boston's 6-3 home victory over Detroit.

Career statistics

Regular season and playoffs

External links

1943 births
Living people
Boston Bruins players
Buffalo Sabres players
Canadian expatriate ice hockey players in the United States
Canadian ice hockey centres
Cleveland Crusaders players
Edmonton Oilers (WHA) players
Ice hockey people from Saskatchewan
Los Angeles Kings players
Minneapolis Bruins players
Oklahoma City Blazers (1965–1977) players
Sportspeople from North Battleford
Springfield Kings players